The 2020–21 season was Burnley's 139th competitive season, their 58th in the top flight of English football, and their fifth consecutive in the Premier League. Along with the Premier League, the club also competed in the FA Cup and EFL Cup. The season covered the period from August 2020 to 30 June 2021.

Transfers

Transfers in

Loans in

Loans out

Transfers out

Pre-season and friendlies

Competitions

Premier League

League table

Results summary

Results by matchday

Matches
The 2020–21 season fixtures were released on 20 August.

FA Cup

The third round draw was made on 30 November, with Premier League and EFL Championship clubs all entering the competition. The draw for the fourth and fifth round were made on 11 January, conducted by Peter Crouch.

EFL Cup

The draw for both the second and third round were confirmed on 6 September, live on Sky Sports by Phil Babb. The fourth round draw was conducted on 17 September 2020 by Laura Woods and Lee Hendrie live on Sky Sports.

Appearances and goals
Source:
Numbers in parentheses denote appearances as substitute.
Players with names struck through and marked  left the club during the playing season.
Players with names in italics and marked * were on loan from another club for the whole of their season with Burnley.
Players listed with no appearances have been in the matchday squad but only as unused substitutes.
Key to positions: GK – Goalkeeper; DF – Defender; MF – Midfielder; FW – Forward

References

Burnley F.C. seasons
Burnley F.C.